Richfield Public Schools, officially Independent School District #280,  is the school district for Richfield, and a portion of neighboring Edina, Minnesota.

Schools
 Richfield Senior High School
 Richfield Dual Language School
 Richfield STEM Elementary School
 Sheridan Hills Elementary School
 Centennial Elementary School
 Richfield Dual Language School
Richfield College Experience Program
richfield spanish imeison

See also
 List of school districts in Minnesota

External links
 Richfield Public Schools

School districts in Minnesota
Education in Hennepin County, Minnesota
Richfield, Minnesota